
Greenstone may refer to:

Geology
 Greenstone (archaeology), various types of stone used by early cultures, covering jade and similar stones 
 Greenstone belt, Archean and Proterozoic volcanic–sedimentary rock sequences
 Isle Royale greenstone Chlorastrolite, found in the Keweenaw Peninsula of Michigan and Isle Royale in the US
 New Zealand Greenstone or Pounamu, several types of hard and durable stone found in southern New Zealand
 Greensand (geology), glauconite bearing sandstone and a geologic formation in the UK
 Greenschist, metamorphosed mafic volcanic rock and a metamorphic facies
 Elvan, a quartz-porphyry found in Cornwall, UK

Places
 Greenstone, Ontario, a municipality in Canada
 Greenstone Hill, a suburb of Johannesburg, South Africa
 Greenstone Point, a high rock spur along the north front of Jones Mountains, Antarctica
 Greenstone River, river in the Otago/Southland region, New Zealand

Other
 Greenstone (software), an open source digital library software package
 Greenstone Building, a Canadian government building in Yellowknife
 Greenstone TV, a television production company, New Zealand
 Greenstone, the generics division of Pfizer

See also
 List of greenstone belts
 Marion Greenstone (1925–2005), American artist